Luke Haakenson (born September 10, 1997) is an American professional soccer player who plays as an attacking midfielder for Major League Soccer club Nashville SC.

Career

College and amateur
Haakenson played four years of college soccer at Creighton University between 2016 and 2019, making 74 appearances, scoring 14 goals and tallying 11 assists.

While playing at college, Haakenson appeared for clubs in the USL PDL for Des Moines Menace and Chicago FC United, and in the NPSL for Minneapolis City SC on two separate occasions.

Professional
On January 13, 2020, Haakenson was selected 80th overall in the 2020 MLS SuperDraft by Nashville SC. He officially signed with the MLS side on February 25, 2020.

On March 6, 2020, Haakenson was loaned out to USL Championship side Charlotte Independence.

 He made his professional debut on March 8, 2020, appearing as a 63rd-minute substitute in a 2-1 win over Sporting Kansas City II.

On June 23, 2021 Haakenson scored his first MLS goals when he scored twice, including a late game winner against Toronto FC.

Career statistics

Club

References

External links
Creighton bio

1997 births
Living people
People from Maple Grove, Minnesota
Soccer players from Minnesota
Sportspeople from the Minneapolis–Saint Paul metropolitan area
Association football midfielders
Creighton Bluejays men's soccer players
Des Moines Menace players
Chicago FC United players
Nashville SC players
Charlotte Independence players
National Premier Soccer League players
USL League Two players
USL Championship players
Nashville SC draft picks
American soccer players
Major League Soccer players